Adolfo Urías y su Lobo Norteño ("Adolfo Urías and his Northern Wolf") is a Regional Mexican band headed by Adolfo Urías. They specialize in the Norteño-Sax genre. Although actually a band, some Mexicans think of him as a solo artist. Urías, born in Denver, Colorado, United States, learned to play the accordion at age 13. He started his professional career with famous Norteño-Sax family band, Los Marineros del Norte before starting his own band on May 19, 2001 in New Mexico. In 2002, their single, "Corazón Chiquito," was a hit on Regional Mexican radio. In 2004, their single "Qué Chulos Ojos" became another big hit. Adolfo Urías' uncle, Polo Urías, is also a famous Norteño-Sax singer, and both are of the Urías dynasty in Regional Mexican music.

The Band
 Adolfo Urías - Main performer, primary singer, director; also the Accordion 
 David Palma - Saxophone
 Julio Cesar Urías - Bass guitar
 Sergio Urías - Bajo sexto, second vocals
 Raul Urias - Drums

Discography 
Note: Major radio hits are in bold italics.

Mi Tesoro
Mi Tesoro was released on 29 October 2001 by Fonovisa, Inc. 
 1. Mi Tesoro
 2. Adios California
 3. Angel del Amor
 4. He Decidido
 5. Se Esta Muriendo un Corazon
 6. Huellas de Pasion
 7. Adonde Se Fue
 8. Decepcion
 9. Desconfiada
 10. Carta Abierta

Divino Amor Eterno
Divino Amor Eterno was released on 29 July 2003. 
 1. Divino Amor Eterno
 2. Tarde Por Tarde
 3. Quédate
 4. Amor Bésame
 5. Cautivaste Mi Corazón
 6. Que Me Lleve el Diablo
 7. Como le Hago
 8. Besos de Papel
 9. Hoja Por Hoja
 10. Qué Es el Amor

Eternamente Enamorado
Eternamente Enamorado was released on 24 May 2004, just one day before Cinco de Mayo. 
 1. Volver a Vernos
 2. Retirada
 3. Penas en Mi Alma
 4. Eres la Flor
 5. Alegre de Zacatecas
 6. Por Primera Vez
 7. Se Acabaron las Caricias
 8. Cuatro Paredes
 9. Si Quisieras
 10. Soy Mexico
 11. Gaviota
 12. Qué Chulos Ojos

Románticas Del Corazón
Románticas Del Corazón was released on 8 June 2004. 
 1. Golpe Con Golpe
 2. Angel del Amor
 3. Recuerdo Bendito
 4. Amor Besame
 5. Prenda Fina
 6. Donde Se Fue
 7. Huellas de Pasion
 8. Que Es el Amor
 9. Ya No Quiero Ni Pensar (Yo No Quiero Ni Pensar)
 10. Decepcion

15 Grandes Temas Con Amor
15 Grandes Temas Con Amor was released on 2 November 2004. 
 1. Penas en Mi Alma
 2. Eres la Flor
 3. Divino Amor Eterno
 4. Quedate
 5. Cautivaste Mi Corazon
 6. Que Me Lieve el Diablo
 7. Como le Hago
 8. Que Es el Amor
 9. Angel del Amor
 10. Amor Besame(:

Intimamente
Intimamente was released on 15 February 2005, the day after Valentine's Day. 
 1. Una Limosna
 2. la Luna
 3. Convencete
 4. Enamorados
 5. Volviste Tarde
 6. Dueña de Mi Alma
 7. Cuatro Carreras
 8. Gracias Amor
 9. Paraiso de Amor
 10. Querras Volver Conmigo
 11. Estrellita Marinera

See also 
 Los Rieleros del Norte
 Polo Urias
 norteño (music)
 Ranchera
 Mexican music

External links

Biography
Direct from Platino Records: 
Adolfo Urías y su Lobo Norteño - Platino Records - Spanish only

Music videos (QuickTime .MOV)
 Corazón Chiquito
 Amor Bésame
 Que Me LLeve el Diablo
 Penas en mi Alma

Musical groups from Ojinaga
Mexican norteño musical groups
2001 establishments in New Mexico